The canton of Abbeville-1 is an administrative division of the Somme department, in northern France. It was created at the French canton reorganisation which came into effect in March 2015. Its seat is in Abbeville.

It consists of the following communes:

Abbeville (partly)
Agenvillers
Bellancourt
Buigny-Saint-Maclou
Canchy
Caours
Domvast
Drucat
Forest-l'Abbaye
Forest-Montiers
Gapennes
Grand-Laviers
Hautvillers-Ouville
Lamotte-Buleux
Millencourt-en-Ponthieu
Neufmoulin
Neuilly-l'Hôpital
Nouvion
Noyelles-sur-Mer
Ponthoile
Port-le-Grand
Sailly-Flibeaucourt
Le Titre
Vauchelles-les-Quesnoy

References

Cantons of Somme (department)